Irvine I. Turner (1914–1974) politician who was the first Black official in Newark, New Jersey elected to the Municipal Council when he took office in 1954. He was also publisher and co-editor of a Black weekly newspaper The New Jersey Record. He was known for his "flamboyant personality and fiery rhetoric". Mayor Kenneth A. Gibson called him "a man who paved the way for black people to be elected to public office." Irvine Turner Boulevard, a large street in Newark, is named after him.

Early life 
Irvine Turner was born in Newark in 1914 and educated in the city, including at Barringer High School. He attended the New York School of Journalism and joined the staff of the New Jersey Guardian.  When the Guardian suspended publication he co-founded The New Jersey Record with Fred R. Clark.   In 1941 was appointed a member of the Newark Fair Employment Practices Committee under Mayor Vincent J. Murphy, becoming its youngest member. In the same year he served on a committee to study one way streets under Public Safety Director John B Keenan. Turner ran unsuccessfully for City Commissioner in 1949 and 1953.

1954 election 
In 1954 Newark adopted a new government system involving a Municipal Council and five wards. Turner ran against Roger Yancy a lawyer advanced by the professional African American community and Italian Johnny Savado. Turner, as a newspaperman, was popular in the community. He also had financial support from Jewish gangster Abner Zwillman and  Mayor Ralph A. Villani He had support from the unions. Civil Rights Congress and Negro Labor Vanguard. The New Jersey Afro American, however, endorsed Yancey. Turner won the election beating Savado by 2-1, with Yancy in third.

Historian Robert Curvin wrote, "With his victory, a common man with intriguing connections and one-time neighborhood hustler was transformed into one of the most important politicians in New Jersey." Amiri Baraka wrote, 'Mr. Turner's breakthrough into American politics was made possible by getting into political shape the Black Central Ward and establishing a leadership category for Black People going for the Democratic party".

Council career 
Cummings was elected again through the 1966 election. During his career, Turner aligned with Mayors Meyer C. Ellenstein and Ralph A. Villani. He helped appoint African Americans for Newark city positions, using these jobs in exchange for the support of voters which he could then provide to other politicians including Hugh Joseph Addonizio. He pushed for more opportunities for African Americans in employment, housing, the police force and government. He had a wide-ranging career and was involved with many issues in the Central Ward and citywide. He criticized the white establishment including slumlords and officials.

During his career he was featured in national magazines like Jet and Ebony.

However, by the 1960s, many in Newark were looking for change. George C. Richardson, under the banner of the United Freedom Democratic Party. ran against Turner in 1966, along with Kenneth A. Gibson's first bid for Mayor. Richardson received only 10,000 votes. In 1967, Amiri Baraka wrote, "Where once [Turner] offered some actual inspiration to Black People in Newark, now he represents the impotence and incompetence of one traditional area of Negro leadership."

As new organizers began to present a challenge to established politicians Turner began criticizing the civil rights activists in Newark. He said, "Violence, rash words, or insulting remarks are not going to get my race any further ahead than they have come.”

In December 1969, Turner was indicted along with Mayor Hugh Joseph Addonizio. In 1970, with growing opposition to the mayor, Dennis Westbrooks ran against Turner, on the ticket of Kenneth A. Gibson. He beat Turner in a runoff.

Later life and legacy 
Irvine Turner had been hospitalized on numerous occasions since the 1950s and sustained numerous strokes. He died on September 9, 1974, leaving a wife and three children. Irvine I. Turner Boulevard was named after Turner.

References 

1914 births
1974 deaths
Barringer High School alumni
Members of the Municipal Council of Newark
African-American city council members in New Jersey
20th-century African-American politicians
20th-century American politicians